The Major Cities of Europe IT Users Group is an independent association of chief information officers, IT managers and department heads of cities. The group was founded in 1982 as a result of an initiative by the Greater London Council. Since then it has focused on innovation in cities, driven by information and communications technology.



City innovation and ICT 
The mission of the group is to promote a voluntary exchange of ideas, strategies, visions and experiences between members to encourage innovation and improve the performance of local governments by using leading edge information and communication technology (ICT).

Members 
Members cover 17 countries and about 40 cities from Scandinavia, Western Eastern and Southern parts of Europe together with some non-European cities, such as Tel Aviv and Boston and other organisations and academia.

Sponsors 
Global and national companies specialising in ICT technologies and solutions and developing innovation in cities support the initiatives of the association by sharing their experiences of deploying projects in each country and across the world.

Collaboration with other organisations and academia 
Partnerships are established with The Public Technology Institute from US and with VITAKO, the German association of ICT providers of local governments. Some universities are partnering with Major Cities of Europe thereby bringing the results of their research activities, for example Autonomous University of Barcelona and CTG – the Center for Technology in Government (Albany University – USA).

Main activities

Annual conference 
The annual conference provides the occasion for distinguished speakers from across Europe to present the latest ICT innovations in their cities and to share successes and challenges. In addition, informal exchanges, networking and discussions take place during the conference. In 2010 the conference was hosted by the city of Berlin, in 2011 by the city of Prato. The programs and handouts were published.

2012 conference in Vienna
The 2012 conference in Vienna was attended by about 300 participants from all over Europe, US and Korea. 
Key topics of the 2012 conference 
 Cities in the Open – Web 2.0, Open Data, E-participation 
 Social Networks
 Mobile Government
 Cities in the Cloud
 Managing and Implementing ICT Innovation
 Cities in Practice 
The programs, handouts and videos were published.

2013 conference in Ljubljana 
"ICT – fostering cities' prosperity" was the overarching theme of the conference, it was attended by about 180 participants. The need for radical transformation of cities is a key factor in responding to these challenges faced by the public sector. How can ICT help cities maintain their lead in providing services and in engaging with their citizens? How can the CIO evolve a management approach to be a leader in driving the city forward? Actual implementation experiences and key ideas will be presented during the conference to answer these questions.
Key topics of the 2013 conference: 
 Managing the ICT Center of today and tomorrow: how the job of the CIO is evolving
 Geographic information systems as a driver of city location-based services and as a unifying technology
 The City Protocol initiative: building together the cities of the 21st Century
 ICT revolution: new instruments for government services 
 Big Data Management: extracting intelligence for new city initiatives
 Open Government, Open Data:  experiences, solutions, rate of return, E-participation, social networks
 Outsourcing in cities: practical experiences and implementation of Cloud computing
The programs and handouts were published.

2014 conference in Zurich 
The 2014 conference in Zürich was attended by about 250 participants from 22 countries and 84 cities, the motto was: "Cities managing complexity in the digital world – prepared for the upcoming challenges?".
Key topics of the 2014 conference:
 ICT, Politics and Citizens
 Cloud computing, shared services: Lessons learnt
 ICT and the pressure of Public finances
 Cyber Security
The programs and handouts were published.

2015 conference in Hamburg 
The 2015 conference in Hamburg was attended by 204 participants. The motto 2015 was: "Living, learning, leading in the connected city".
Key topics of the 2015 conference:
 Rethinking e-government
 Governance of Smart Cites
 Openness, Transparency and the role of Social Media
 The School 2020
 The future workplace
 The city 2020
The program and handouts were published.

2016 conference in Florence 
In 2016 the conference in the city of Florence was attended by about 400 delegates from all over Europe, the motto 2016 was: "City Renaissance in the Digital Age".
Key topics of the 2016 conference:
 Citizens participation
 Government in the Cloud
 Internet of Things
 E-government & Digital transformation
 Safety & Security
 Smart Education
 eHealth / e-Care
 Tomorrow Is Only a Day Away
The program and handouts were published.

2017 conference in Zagreb 
In 2017 the conference will be hosted by the city of Zagreb from 12 to 14 June. The motto 2017 is: "The Digital Future – Cities Facing the Reality".<ref></ref</ref>
Key topics of the 2017 conference will be:

 E-government initiatives – has the transformation of public services happened?
 The great vanishing act – public administration and the impact of emerging technologies
 Boosting the digital economy – the role of local public services
 Local democracy in a social media world
 Role of technology in assisting with the resilience
 Embedding and facilitating innovation in public services

Workshops 
Member cities run workshops, usually lasting one day, to share and discuss experiences focusing on a specific topic of interest. The results of the workshops are published on the association's website.

Topics for workshops included:
 IT security for cities
 Big Data management 
 ICT revolution vs. new instruments for Government services
 Geographic information system (GIS) as driver of city location based services 
 IT and politics
 Managing and implementing ICT – new ICT roles 
 The City Protocol Society
 Open Data
 Open Source Software

Participation in EU programs 
The association makes it possible to take advantage of the experience of its members and of the value of the network of innovative cities to participate successfully in selected EU programs, such as FUPOL. Vitako and Major Cities of Europe organised the European Local Government Conference on ICT and the Local Government transformation in Europe in which the Smart Cities Project was presented.

Newsletter 
The newsletter gives access to news about the association, about events and new emerging topics and technologies to support innovation.

References

External links
 Majorcities website
 The Public Technology Institute
 FUPOL

Cross-European advocacy groups